Pezzoli may also refer to:

Pezzoli (surname)

Places 
Pezzoli, a frazione of the municipality of Ceregnano, in the Province of Rovigo, Veneto, Italy
Pezzoli, a frazione of the municipality of Treviglio, in the Province of Bergamo, Lombardy, Italy
Museo Poldi Pezzoli, an art museum in Milan, Italy
Poldi Pezzoli Madonna or Madonna with the Sleeping Christ Child, a tempera on canvas painting by Andrea Mantegna